Idlewild Presbyterian Church is a historic church located at 1750 Union Avenue in Midtown Memphis, Tennessee. Idlewild is a part of the Presbyterian Church (USA).

History 
Founded in 1891, Idlewild grew into a prominent Memphis church over the next several decades, moving into its current building in 1928.

During the Civil Rights Movement, Idlewild was one of the few churches in Memphis that held racially integrated worship services. Following the assassination of Martin Luther King Jr., Idlewild helped found the Metropolitan Inter-Faith Association (MIFA), a community service organization that serves 50,000 people in West Tennessee annually.

Idlewild ordained its first women deacons in 1968, and had a female associate minister as early as 1974. Today, three of the four ministers at Idlewild are women.

The church was added to the National Register of Historic Places in 2009.

Recently Idlewild has continued its tradition of serving the community through partnerships with local schools and the More Than a Meal project, and through partnerships with local organizations that seek to promote social justice throughout the Memphis community. Idlewild is welcoming and affirming of the LGBT community, and blesses same-sex unions in its sanctuary.

Steve Montgomery served as Idlewild's pastor from 2000 until 2019. After an interim period under the leadership of pastor Anne Apple, Idlewild called David Powers to serve as pastor in late 2020
 During the COVID-19 pandemic, Idlewild has served as a mobile food bank distribution site for families in need in the Memphis area.

Sanctuary Building 
Idlewild's current building was designed by George Awsumb, and it is in the Gothic Revival style. The building is similar to the nearby Rhodes College, a private liberal arts college nominally affiliated with the PC(USA). Idlewild's bell tower was completed in 1999; together the bells weigh nearly 27,000 pounds.

Recently, nearby developments have incorporated design features to engage with Idlewild's architecture as a prominent feature in the neighborhood.

See also 
 Presbyterian Church (USA)
 List of Presbyterian churches in the United States
 List of Presbyterian Church (U.S.A.) synods and presbyteries
 Memphis, Tennessee

References

External links 

 Website
 Webpage of the Presbyterian Church (USA)

Presbyterian churches in Tennessee
Churches on the National Register of Historic Places in Tennessee
Gothic Revival church buildings in Tennessee
Churches completed in 1926
Churches in Memphis, Tennessee
National Register of Historic Places in Memphis, Tennessee